CapoeirArab is a sports association, located in Damascus, Syria. CapoeirArabs mission is to teach Capoeira to all youth, regardless of social status and income, and using Capoeira as a tool for social development for youth, refugees and vulnerable groups. CapoeirArabs work with capoeira includes acrobatic, music, dancing, the movements of capoeira, painting, singing and discussion groups, among other things.

History
CapoeirArab was founded in 2007 by Tarek Alsaleh and started Capoeira classes in Damascus for Syrian youth. The focus is to use capoeira as a tool to work with youth from strained communities, thereby giving them strength, skills, friendships, and finally educating them to become Capoeira teachers themselves. In 2009 CapoeirArab started a six-month project, in partnership with UNICEF and Terre des Hommes in Al Tanf refugee camp in Syria, playing and teaching capoeira with Palestinian camp residents. The project was a resounding success, inspiring those behind CapoeirArab to establish a UK-registered International NGO called Bidna Capoeira.

Mission
Bidna Capoeira's mission is to advance community development and social education, whilst at the same time enhancing physical and psychosocial well-being through the art of Capoeira. Currently, the NGO is conducting projects with refugees and  communities worldwide, but focusing primarily on the Middle East.

References

Capoeira organizations
Damascus
2007 establishments in Syria